SIB-1553A is a nicotinic acetylcholine receptor agonist that is selective for receptors with a β4 subunit. Administration of SIB-1553A improved memory and attention in a Parkinson's disease model.

References

Nicotinic agonists
Nootropics
Phenols
Thioethers
Pyrrolidines